Anterior pulvinar nucleus (nucleus pulvinaris anterior) is one of four traditionally anatomically distinguished nuclei of the pulvinar of the thalamus. The other three nuclei of the pulvinar are called lateral, inferior and medial pulvinar nuclei.

Connections

Functions

References 

Pulvinar nuclei